Alessandra Becatti (born 30 April 1965) is an Italian female retired heptathlete, which participated at the 1987 World Championships in Athletics.

Personal best
Decathlon: 5785 pts ( Götzis, 24 May 1987) at the 1987 Hypo-Meeting
100 m hs: 14.00, high jump: 1.68 m, shot put: 11.34 m, 200 m: 24.58;
 long jump: 16.17 m, javelin throw: 37.64 m, 800 m: 2:12.18

Achievements

See also
 Italian all-time lists - Heptathlon

References

External links
 

1965 births
Living people
Italian female pentathletes
Italian heptathletes
World Athletics Championships athletes for Italy
20th-century Italian women